A maid is a female employed in domestic service.

Maid, MAID or Maids may also refer to:
 Maid (title), a title granted to the eldest daughter of a Scottish Laird
 Maiden, a virginal woman
 Maids (film), directed by Fernando Meirelles and Nando Olival
 Maids (2015 TV series), a 2015 South Korean costume drama
 Maids (comics), a 2020 graphic novel by Katie Skelly
 Maid (miniseries), a 2021 American miniseries
 Massive array of idle disks, a data storage system
 Medical assistance in dying, see Euthanasia in Canada
 Mobile advertising ID, a device or operating environment identity for advertising services

See also 
 The Maid (disambiguation)
 The Housemaid (disambiguation)